Nicolaas Nederpeld (11 November 1886 – 6 June 1969) was a Dutch foil fencer. He competed at the 1924 and 1928 Summer Olympics.

References

External links
 

1886 births
1969 deaths
Dutch male foil fencers
Olympic fencers of the Netherlands
Fencers at the 1924 Summer Olympics
Fencers at the 1928 Summer Olympics
Sportspeople from The Hague
20th-century Dutch people